Milleria adalifa is a moth in the family Zygaenidae. It is found in Asia.

The forewings are dusky white, with black veins. The hindwings are pure white, clouded with pale chrome-yellow from the anal angle to beyond the middle. The apex and the outer margin are black.

Subspecies
Milleria adalifa adalifa (India, Burma)
Milleria adalifa candida (Snellen van Vollenhoven, 1863) (Sumatra, Java)
Milleria adalifa fuhoshonis Strand, 1916 (Taiwan)

References

Moths described in 1847
Chalcosiinae